Calocosmus fulvicollis is a species of beetle in the family Cerambycidae. It was described by Fisher in 1925. It is known from Cuba.

References

Calocosmus
Beetles described in 1925
Endemic fauna of Cuba